Chinese Haitians (French: Sino-Haïtien) are Haitians of Chinese ancestry who immigrated to or were born in Haiti. There are about 230 Chinese people living in Haiti as of 2010.

Overview
Many Chinese people living in Haiti are businessmen in governmental or other businesses while there are other Chinese nationals working in Haitian companies as well. With last names like Wu, Wah, Fung, Fong-Ging, Fungcap, were the first known Chinese families arrived in Haiti in the late 1890s, fleeing crumbling dynasties, while continuous waves came into Haiti in the 1970s and 1980s with them mostly coming from Taiwan. There is only one Chinese restaurant in Haiti, the Wujiayuan Restaurant in Pétion-Ville, an upper-class neighborhood in Port-au-Prince. The restaurant was arranged as a shelter during the 2010 Haiti earthquake by China's foreign ministry.

About 230 Chinese people were in Haiti at the time of the disaster. Most of the 230 Chinese people were safe but eight Chinese police officers on a peacekeeping mission died in a collapsed United Nations building.

See also

 Asian Latin Americans
 Chinese Caribbeans

References

Chinese Caribbean
Ethnic groups in Haiti
 
Haiti